Miss World 1957, the 7th edition of the Miss World pageant, was held on 14 October 1957 at the Lyceum Ballroom in London, United Kingdom. 23 candidates competed for the Miss World crown. The winner was Marita Lindahl, represented Finland. She was crowned by Miss World 1956, Petra Schürmann of Germany.

Results

Contestants

  - Ronnie Goodlet
  - Lilo Fischer
  - Jeanne Chandelle
  - Judith Eleanor Welch
  - Lilian Juul Madsen
  - Marita Lindahl †
  - Claude Inès Navarro
  - Annemarie Karsten
  - Leila Williams
  - Nana Gasparatou
  - Christina van Zijp
  - Rúna Brynjólfdóttir
  - Nessa Welsh
  - Sara Elimor
  - Anna Gorassini
  - Muneko Yorifuji
  - Josee Jaminet
  - Danielle Muller
  - Adele June Kruger
  - Elenore Edin
  - Jacqueline Tapia
  - Charlotte Sheffield †
  - Consuelo Nouel

Notes

Debuts

Returns
Last competed in 1955:

Withdrawals
  – Protesting against the invasion of the Suez Canal by British forces.
 
  – Alicja Bobrowska
 
  – Leyla Sayar

References

External links
 Miss World official website

Miss World
1957 in London
1957 beauty pageants
Beauty pageants in the United Kingdom
October 1957 events in the United Kingdom